L-olivosyl-oleandolide 3-O-methyltransferase (OleY) is an enzyme with systematic name S-adenosyl-L-methionine:L-olivosyl-oleandolide B 3-O-methyltransferase. This enzyme catalyses the following chemical reaction

 S-adenosyl-L-methionine + L-olivosyl-oleandolide  S-adenosyl-L-homocysteine + L-oleandrosyl-oleandolide

The enzyme is involved in the biosynthesis of the macrolide antibiotic oleandomycin in Streptomyces antibioticus.

References

External links 
 

EC 2.1.1